Homeland is a 2004 book Dale Maharidge and photographer Michael Williamson about American life after the September 11 attacks.

References

External links 

 

2004 non-fiction books
English-language books
Seven Stories Press books
Books about politics of the United States